A  polar organelle is a structure at a specialised region of the bacterial polar membrane that is associated with the flagellar apparatus. This flagellum-associated structure can easily be distinguished from the other membrane regions in ultrathin sections of embedded bacteria by electron microscopy when the cell membrane is orientated perpendicular to the viewing direction. There, the membrane appears slightly thickened with a finely frilled layer facing the inside of the cell.
It is also possible to isolate these polar organelles from the bacterial cells and study them in face view in negatively stained preparations.

The polar organelle bears a fine array of attached particles in hexagonal close packing and these have been shown to possess ATPase activity. The polar organelle is found in close juxtaposition to the points of insertion of the bacterial flagella into the plasma membrane, especially where multiple flagella bases are grouped in a region of the cell membrane. It may thus be inferred that the polar organelle could be of importance in the supply and transfer of energy to the bidirectional molecular rotational motor situated at the base of each individual bacterial flagellum (see also electrochemical gradient).

References 

Cell anatomy